Perarasu (born 8 January 1967) is an Indian film director who works primarily in Tamil cinema. As a director, he is best known for his commercial Tamil movies with actors Vijay and Bharath. He has also been credited as an actor, music director, singer and lyricist in some of his ventures.

Personal life
Perarasu, was born on 8 January 1967 in Natarasankottai in Sivaganga district, Tamil Nadu.

Perarasu,  married Shanthi at Nattarasankottai on June 11, 2000. A female child Viruthika was born to them in July 2001. When Shanthi conceived a second time, she was given abortion pills, she fell ill and was sent  by Perarasu to her parents. A panchayat was summoned and they started living together. However, Perarasu insisted on Shanthi moving to Nattarasankottai. During this time, Perarasu received an explicit divorce decree without Shanthi's knowledge. She took steps to have the decree rescinded. She moved the JM court to Bhavani, who asked Perarasu to pay child support. Though Perarasu had filed a petition challenging the order, neither he nor his counsel appeared in court when the matter was called on five occasions. On September 12, 2007, a judicial magistrate court in Bhavani in Erode district, directed the film director to pay alimony of Rs 10,000 a month to Shanthi and Rs 5,000 a month to their daughter.

Perarasu then married Krishnaveni.

Career
He tried for 7 to 8 years to make it big and had some off-beat stories. When he was new to Chennai, he used to frequent AVM and stand in front of the studios longing to visit the place. He bribed a production in charge ten rupees one day and got himself into the studios. His experience of 15 to 16 years in the industry taught him to analyse the pulse of the audience and give them what they want. He honed his skills under Rama Narayanan and N. Maharajan. Apart from assisting, Perarasu appeared in few films doing small uncredited roles. He wants his films to be packed with mind-blowing songs, speedy screenplay, punchy dialogue and in between inserted with sentiments, comedy, twists and turns.

Perarasu made his directorial debut with Thirupaachi starring Vijay in the lead role as his 40th film. The film was released on the eve of Pongal with 207 prints and the film received positive reviews from critics claiming that "you may strive hard to find anything new in Tirupachi, which is old wine served in a new bottle, with a different label". The film completed a 100-day theatrical run among 112 screens in Tamil Nadu and completed 200 days in more than 25 centres.

After the success of Thirupaachi, A. M. Rathnam called Perarasu to make a film with Vijay re-uniting with him for second time. Sivakasi was Perarasu's second collaboration with Vijay after Thirupaachi and producer Rathnam's third film with Vijay after Kushi and Ghilli. The film was released on Diwali to positive reviews with a critic claiming that ""This formula had worked well for director Perarasu and Vijay in Thirupaachi and now the team has re-worked it. This time, however, it will test your patience as it is not meant for the class audience or those seeking quality entertainment. Perarasu and Vijay believe only in catering to the mass audience who want their dose of unpretentious masala mix" but eventually became a successful venture at box office.

During the making of Sivakasi, representatives from AVM Productions approached Perarasu to make a commercial film with Ajith Kumar in the lead role. The director immediately accepted the offer and told the producer the story of the film during the meeting and the film was announced publicly two days later. In August 2005, it became clear that the film would begin in November and that Riyaz Khan would play the lead antagonist role in the project. Sadha was signed on to play the lead role after early reports suggested that either Nayanthara, Renuka Menon or Gopika would play the lead female role. The film was named Thirupathi and was launched officially on 15 September 2005 with Vijay attending the opening ceremony. The film was critically panned, with critics claiming that the film drew too much resemblance to Perarasu's previous projects, Thirupaachi and Sivakasi.

After the success of Thirupathi, Perarasu announced a project called "Pandigai" with S. J. Suryah but the project was cancelled and he announced his next project Dharmapuri with Vijayakanth in 2006 since Producer A. M. Rathnam expressed his desire of Perarasu directing a film for him again after Sivakasi. Incidentally it was Rathnam who suggested Vijayakanth's name for the film. When Rathnam and captain heard the ‘one liner’ of the movie, they both liked it instantly and thus Dharmapuri was born without even a heroine. Indiaglitz wrote: Perarasu has dished out a movie that would certainly appease front-benchers. A commercial pot-boiler, the movie will be lapped by Vijayakanth's fans. Sure to make it big in rural centres, the movie also has enough stunt sequences for action-lovers".

Perarasu's next film was Pazhani, starring Bharath and Kajal Aggarwal. It was average at the box office.

Perarasu then directed films like, Thiruvannamalai and Thiruthani. Thiruvannamalai was a commercial hit, but Thiruthani failed at box office. Later a Malayalam action movie Samrajyam 2 was directed with Unni Mukundan as the main hero, which was a sequel to the first part of Mammootty film Samrajyam . Though the film was action packed, entertainer, this film failed to attract the audience, ending up in becoming a heavy flop.

Style of work 
Perarasu is known primarily for directing films which he says are "aimed at the common man who looks at pure entertainment", rather than critics. His films are also known for having sentiment and action scenes in equal proportions. Due to his films being named after towns and cities, he has been nicknamed "Oorarasu" by the media, the term being a portmanteau of "oor" (meaning town or city) and his name Perarasu.

Filmography
Director
All films are in Tamil, unless otherwise noted.

As lyricist

As singer

References

External links
 

Tamil film directors
Living people
Tamil film poets
Film directors from Tamil Nadu
People from Sivaganga district
21st-century Indian film directors
Malayalam film directors
Tamil screenwriters
Screenwriters from Tamil Nadu
Malayalam screenwriters
1967 births